Rowland Hill Watt (17 July 1898 – 27 July 1970) was an Australian rules footballer who played for Essendon in the Victorian Football League (VFL).

Watt arrived at Essendon from Rochester and spent a season with Essendon Association before joining their VFL club. He was one of the small players in the team which saw them called the 'Mosquito Fleet' and he was a member of their 1923 and 1924 premiership sides. Although he started as a centreman he spent most of his time at Essendon either as a wingman, half forward flanker and occasionally roving.

Watt returned to Rochester as captain-coach of Rochester in 1932.

His younger brother Rod Watt played briefly with Essendon in the mid-1920s.

References

External links

1898 births
Australian rules footballers from Victoria (Australia)
Essendon Football Club players
Essendon Football Club Premiership players
Essendon Association Football Club players
Rochester Football Club players
1970 deaths
Two-time VFL/AFL Premiership players